The 1922 Rice Owls football team was an American football team that represented Rice University as a member of the Southwest Conference (SWC) during the 1922 college football season. In its tenth season under head coach Philip Arbuckle, the team compiled a 4–4 record (1–4 against SWC opponents) and was outscored by a total of 128 to 96.

Schedule

References

Rice
Rice
Rice Owls football seasons
Rice Owls football